Pedro José Amadeo Pissis Marín (Brioude, France, May 17, 1812 – January 21, 1889, Santiago de Chile) was a French geologist who served the Chilean government in the 19th century. He played an influential role in the cartography of Chile. Pissis worked in Brazil and Bolivia before he arrived to Chile. He left Bolivia due to political problems and was preparing his departure to France in Valparaíso when Chilean minister Manuel Camilo Vial contacted him to do a geologic and mineralogic description of the Republic of Chile. Monte Pissis, the third highest mountain in the Western Hemisphere and second highest volcano in the world is named after him.

References

Sources 
 Memoria Chilena
 

French emigrants to Chile
19th-century French geologists
French cartographers
19th-century Chilean geologists
Members of the French Academy of Sciences
Recipients of the Legion of Honour
1889 deaths
1812 births